Barrington Daniels Parker (November 17, 1915 – June 2, 1993) was a United States district judge of the United States District Court for the District of Columbia.

Education and career

Parker was born in Rosslyn, Virginia, on November 17, 1915. His father was dean of the now-closed Terrell Law School in Washington, D.C. Barrington  attended Dunbar High School in Washington, and graduated from Lincoln University in Pennsylvania in 1936 with an Artium Baccalaureus degree in economics, and from the University of Pennsylvania in 1938 with a Master of Arts, finally receiving a Juris Doctor from the University of Chicago Law School in 1947.

Federal judicial service

On September 15, 1969, Parker was nominated by President Richard Nixon to a seat on the United States District Court for the District of Columbia vacated by Judge Joseph Charles McGarraghy. Parker was confirmed by the United States Senate on December 18, 1969, and received his commission on December 19, 1969. Parker assumed senior status on December 19, 1985, and served in that capacity until his death. He died on June 2, 1993 at Holy Cross Hospital in Silver Spring, Maryland.

Notable cases

Parker's most high profile case was the criminal trial of John Hinckley Jr.

Parker also ordered the closure of the High Security Unit in Lexington, Kentucky, a women's prison wing used to house certain prisoners in isolation based on their political beliefs or affiliations. Parker said in his ruling that: '"The treatment of the plaintiffs has skirted elemental standards of human decency. The exaggerated security, small group isolation and staff harassment serve to constantly undermine the inmates' morale". He ordered the Bureau of Prisons to rewrite its regulations and transfer the handful of prisoners held there into the general prison population.

Personal life

Parker's son, Barrington Daniels Parker Jr., is a senior judge of the United States Court of Appeals for the Second Circuit.

See also 
 List of African-American federal judges
 List of African-American jurists

References

Sources
 

1915 births
1993 deaths
Judges of the United States District Court for the District of Columbia
United States district court judges appointed by Richard Nixon
20th-century American judges
African-American judges
Washington, D.C., Republicans
20th-century American lawyers
Dunbar High School (Washington, D.C.) alumni